Alcidion humeralis is a species of longhorn beetles of the subfamily Lamiinae. It was described by Perty in 1832, and is found in Mexico, Panama, Samer, and Bolivia.

References

Beetles described in 1832
Alcidion